Condorcacha (possibly from Quechua kuntur condor, khacha crusted dirt, "crusted condor dirt") is a mountain in the Chila mountain range in the Andes of Peru, about  high. It is located in the Arequipa Region, Castilla Province, Chachas District. Condorcacha lies in a remote, mountainous area east of Orcopampa. It is situated southeast of Huayllatarpuna.

References

Mountains of Peru
Mountains of Arequipa Region